Charles Stewart Almon Ritchie,  (September 23, 1906 – June 7, 1995) was a Canadian diplomat and diarist.

Born in Halifax, Nova Scotia, Ritchie was educated at the University of King's College, in Halifax, Nova Scotia, Pembroke College, Oxford, Harvard University, and École Libre des Sciences Politiques. He joined the Department of External Affairs in 1934 eventually becoming Canada's ambassador to West Germany (1954–1958), Permanent Representative to the United Nations (1958–1962), ambassador to the United States during the presidencies of John F. Kennedy and Lyndon Johnson (1962–1966), ambassador to the North Atlantic Council (1966–1967) and from 1967 to 1971 was Canadian High Commissioner to the United Kingdom in London.

While Ritchie's career as a diplomat marked him as an important person in the history of Canadian foreign relations, he became famous through the publication of his diaries, first The Siren Years, and then three follow-ups.  The diaries document both his diplomatic career and his private life, including the beginning of his long love affair with the Anglo-Irish writer Elizabeth Bowen, which began in 1941 when he was still single and she married, survived through his marriage in 1948 and long periods of separation, lasting until Bowen's death in 1973.

In 1969 he was made a Companion of the Order of Canada "for services in the field of diplomacy". He received honorary doctorates from Trent University (1976), York University (1992) and Carleton University (1992).

Ritchie came from a prominent family in Nova Scotia. His brother, Roland Ritchie, continuing a family tradition in the law, was a puisne justice of the Supreme Court of Canada.

Selected works
  The Siren Years: A Canadian Diplomat Abroad 1937–1945 Toronto: Macmillan, 1974. , winner of the  1974 Governor General's Award for non-fiction.
  An Appetite for Life: The Education of a Young Diarist, 1924–1927 Toronto: Macmillan, 1977. .
 Diplomatic Passport Toronto: Macmillan, 1981. .
 Storm Signals Toronto: Macmillan, 1983. .

References

External links

 Charles Stewart Almon Ritchie at The Canadian Encyclopedia by Norman Hillmer
 Heads of Post List

1906 births
1995 deaths
Ambassadors of Canada to the United States
Ambassadors of Canada to West Germany
High Commissioners of Canada to the United Kingdom
Permanent Representatives of Canada to the United Nations
Permanent Representatives of Canada to NATO
University of King's College alumni
Alumni of Pembroke College, Oxford
Harvard University alumni
Canadian Anglicans
Canadian diarists
Canadian people of Scottish descent
Companions of the Order of Canada
Writers from Halifax, Nova Scotia
Governor General's Award-winning non-fiction writers
20th-century diarists